Journey to Freedom is the fourth studio album by American recording artist Michelle Williams, released on September 9, 2014, by E1 Music and Light Records. It marked her first release under the label after severing professional ties with longtime record company Columbia Records and manager Mathew Knowles in 2009. Following a hiatus from her recording career, Williams' album, a collaboration with main producer Harmony Samuels, was a fusion of both urban contemporary gospel and R&B sounds.

Released to critical acclaim, Journey to Freedom is ranked as the number-one, best gospel album of 2014 by Jubilee Cast. It is Williams' highest-charting album on the US Billboard 200, where it debuted in the top 30 and her second album to reach number two on the US Top Gospel Albums chart, where it is ranked by Billboard as one of the top 20 gospel albums of 2014.

The album was preceded by the release of the lead single, "If We Had Your Eyes" which peaked in the top 20 of the US Adult R&B Songs chart. A third single, "Say Yes", reunited Williams with her former Destiny's Child bandmates Beyoncé Knowles and Kelly Rowland and peaked at number one on the Billboard Hot Gospel Songs chart for seven weeks. "Say Yes" was awarded Song of the Year at the 2014 Gospel Touch Music Awards and Music Video of the Year at the 2015 Stellar Awards, where Williams, Beyoncé Knowles and Kelly Rowland performed the song live. To further promote the album, Williams went on a tour in the United States. The album was nominated for Outstanding Gospel Album (Traditional or Contemporary) at the 46th NAACP Image Awards and earned Williams four nominations at the 30th annual Stellar Awards.

Background
In October 2008, Williams released her third studio album Unexpected, her first release since the disbanding of Destiny's Child. A breakaway from her previous solo efforts, gospel albums Heart to Yours (2002) and Do You Know (2004), the dance-pop-R&B album gained generally favorable reviews from critics, but became a moderate seller. Meanwhile, lead single "We Break the Dawn" and follow-up "The Greatest" became number-one hits on the US dance and dance airplay charts, though plans for a reissue of the album failed to materialize. In July 2009, Williams began a limited six-week engagement at the Cambridge Theatre in Chicago, making her the first African-American to be cast in the West End production of the musical. Her run was extended and Williams continued appearing for three additional weeks for an extended engagement through September 2009.

In January 2010, Michelle announced that she had parted ways with manager Mathew Knowles and Music World Entertainment. The following months, Williams made a return to Broadway by commencing a seven-week limited engagement in Chicago at the New York Ambassador Theatre, and in August, she joined the eighth series of British television show Strictly Come Dancing. In 2012, her collaboration with Ultra Naté, "Waiting On You" became her third top 20 hit on the US Dance Club Play chart.

On June 7, 2012, it was announced that Williams had been signed to Light Records and was due to release her fourth studio album in 2013. On January 3, 2013, it was announced that Williams would play Sandra in the national tour of the Tony-nominated musical Fela!, beginning January 29 in Washington, D.C. and playing in a total of 16 cities. On February 3, 2013, Williams performed at the Super Bowl XLVII halftime show, alongside Beyoncé and Kelly Rowland. On May 28, 2013, Kelly Rowland premiered "You Changed", featuring Beyoncé and Michelle Williams, on The Raheem DaVaughn Show on BLIS.fm. "You Changed" peaked at number 16 on the US R&B Digital Songs chart.

Music and lyrics
"Fire" contains a biblical reference to Shadrach, Meshack, and Abednego, 'over a booming, midtempo track' which 'offers a great message of overcoming trials'.

Release and promotion

Singles
"If We Had Your Eyes" was digitally released worldwide as the lead single from Journey to Freedom on June 24, 2013. Fantasia Barrino features on the official remix which was released November 4, 2013. The song peaked on the US Adult R&B Songs chart at number 19 and the US Hot Gospel Songs chart at number 22. On September 3, 2013, a Derek Blanks-directed music video was premiered via YouTube and features appearances from the song's producer, Harmony Samuels and also former Destiny's Child member, LeToya Luckett.

"Fire", produced by Harmony Samuels, was digitally released worldwide as the second single on September 24, 2013. Williams recorded an acoustic live performance for Yahoo! Music. The music video premiered via YouTube on May 10, 2014, directed by Derek Blanks. Billy Johnson Jr. of Rolling Stone described the video as 'scorching in the vein of the Ohio Players's “Fire” album cover, except that Williams is, ahem, clothed. Williams looks flawless against the flame inducing red, orange, and yellow filters, backdrops, and lighting, leaving computer screens smoking.'

"Say Yes" featuring former Destiny's Child bandmates Beyoncé and Kelly Rowland was released as the third single on June 2, 2014. Although not a Destiny's Child song, "Say Yes" is the first song released as a single including all three former members since the group's disbandment in 2005. An accompanying music video was released on June 18, 2014. The music video for "Say Yes" was directed by Matthew A. Cherry and was filmed on May 20, 2014.

"Say Yes" peaked at number one on the US Hot Gospel Songs chart for seven non-consecutive weeks, number 9 on the Bubbling Under Hot 100 and number 14 on the US Heatseekers Songs chart. It also appeared on several Billboard year-end charts between 2014 and 2015 and in 2019 was ranked as one of the top 50 gospel songs of the decade. On the 2014 year-end charts, "Say Yes" was ranked number 7 on US Gospel Songs, number 19 on US Gospel Airplay, number 11 on US Gospel Digital Songs and number 4 on US Gospel Streaming Songs. In 2015, "Say Yes" was ranked number 23 on the top US Hot Gospel Songs year-end chart. In 2019, Billboard ranked "Say Yes" at number 50 on the decade-end 2010-2019 US Hot Gospel Songs chart.
Internationally "Say Yes" charted in Belgium, France, Netherlands  and the UK; where it peaked at number 15 on the UK R&B Chart and number 8 on the UK Indie Chart. The music video was awarded Music Video of the Year at the 2015 Stellar Awards, where Williams performed the song live with Beyoncé & Kelly Rowland. Their live performance was released as a single on April 15, 2015.

Critical reception

Journey To Freedom received highly positive reviews from music critics. Andy Kellman of AllMusic wrote 'this is among Williams' best work, highlighted by "Need Your Help," "Fire," and "If We Had Your Eyes."' Peggy Oliver for Soul Tracks expressed similarly, writing Journey to Freedom 'is by far Williams’ best body of work, a personal cleansing that further amplifies her dexterity with multiple genres. Michelle Williams’ half-dozen year hiatus away from the studio has served its purpose: she has emerged as an artist clearly traveling on her own artistic road to freedom, and delivering an album that was well worth the wait.' Mike Wass of Idolator complimented the production, praising the mix between R&B and Gospel noting 'Journey To Freedom is the perfect bridge between the singer’s gospel and secular output. By focusing on universal themes (love, hope and inner strength) and exploring new genres, Michelle has created something both inclusive and joyously experimental.' Wass also claiming Journey to Freedom is 'her best album to date.'

Timothy Yap of Hallels lent praise to the lyrical themes, writing, 'it's a theological meaty album with doses of spiritual muscle-inducing supplements derived directly from Scripture.' However, he noted 'the record is far too slanted towards having far too many mid-pacers. Songs such as "Free," "Just Like You" and "Everything" basically utilizes the same urban template effortlessly without having much time invested in developing stronger hooks making them more memorable. "Believe in Me," a smooth Diane Warren-styled R&B beat ballad, is redemptive in terms of breaking up the tempo. Nevertheless, despite the quibbles, Journey to Freedom is still one of this year's important releases. Williams could have chosen to journey the safe and money grabbing route by compromising her beliefs and Christian stance. But here she chooses to be true to her faith, her calling and her Lord; and the rewards are eternal.'

The GospelPundit praised Samuels' production and Williams' vocals writing; '[the album] is a catchy collection of upbeat music that promises a party, while inspiring and encouraging listeners. The Samuels Nigerian heritage provides a rich musical backdrop of African-influenced beats and chants, while his proven success in mainstream music (Chris Brown, J Lo, Ne-Yo and more) promises pop and urban styles that are relevant to a broad marketplace of music lovers. Michelle Williams tops it all off with vocals that range from pop to passionate, simple to soaring, all the while staying true to her own voice and vibe.' RoJay of Middlechild Promotions lauded the Williams' vocal performance 'although still criminally underrated as a vocalist, Michelle Williams takes control of her destiny once again and delivers another solid solo album where she gets to showcase the side of her personality that makes her as genuine and true to her art as her peers.'

Accolades

Commercial performance 
Journey to Freedom debuted at number 29 on the US Billboard 200, Williams' highest appearance to date. It became her second debut at number two on the Top Gospel Albums chart, repeating the peak of her album Do You Know (2004). On the Top Gospel Albums chart Journey to Freedom debuted behind Lecrae's Anomaly, which was also released September 9, 2014 and became the first full-length album to top both the Billboard 200 and Top Gospel Albums chart simultaneously, selling over 88,000 units in its first week.Journey to Freedom also debuted at number 7 on the US Independent Albums chart and number 6 on the UK Christian & Gospel Albums chart.

Journey to Freedom spent a total of 30 weeks on the US Top Gospel Albums chart, making it her second longest-appearing album on the chart, following her debut album Heart to Yours (2002) which spent a total of 46 weeks on the chart. Billboard ranked the album at number 20 on the 2014 year-end chart, which lists the year's top 50 best-performing albums on the US Top Gospel Albums chart. Furthermore, Billboard ranked Williams as the 13th Top Gospel Artist of 2014 and 5th Top Gospel Artist - Female of 2014.

Track listing

Personnel

Jose Cardoza – engineering, recording and mixing
Carlos King – engineering, recording and mixing
Dave Kutch – mastering
Derek Blanks – photography, art direction and design
Kim Kimble – hair
Latasha Wright – makeup
Jason Bolin – wardrobe

Agate Adorned – jewellery
Joe "Flip" Wilson – A&R
Steve "Supe" White – A&R
Phil "Phillionaire" Thornton – marketing
W&W Public Relations – publicity
Holly Carter (Relevé Entertainment) – management
Jonathan Azu (Red Light Entertainment) – management

Charts

Weekly charts

Year-end charts

Awards and nominations

References

External links

2014 albums
Michelle Williams (singer) albums
E1 Music albums
Albums produced by Harmony Samuels